Oricon Karaoke Chart is issued weekly and yearly by Oricon. It is one of the main charts of Oricon with Oricon Singles Chart and Oricon Albums Chart. Single and Album Chart both are based on sales, while this chart rankings are based on the playings in Karaoke in Japan. Karaoke is a popular cultural event in Japan. This chart could indicate the popularity of songs in Japan in another viewpoints.
The sources are DAM and JOYSOUND.

Record
The most consecutive weekly No.1.

Yearly chart history

2010s

References

External links 
 DAM website 
 JOYSOUND website 

Oricon
Karaoke